Night of Miracles (Spanish: Noche de milagros)  is a 1954 Venezuelan drama film directed by Renzo Russo and starring Elena Fernan, Aldo Monti and Violeta Peñalver.

Cast
 Elena Fernan 
 Aldo Monti 
 Violeta Peñalver 
 Miro Anton 
 Mario Chaves 
 Xiomara Latos 
 José Antonio Gutiérrez
 Francisco Bernalche 
 Marcisa Mundett 
 Hermelinda Alvarado 
 Josefina Briseño 
 Eloy Cisneros 
 Juan Ramon Soler
 Dario Lauri

References

Bibliography 
 Darlene J. Sadlier. Latin American Melodrama: Passion, Pathos, and Entertainment. University of Illinois Press, 2009.

External links 
 

1954 films
1954 drama films
Venezuelan drama films
1950s Spanish-language films
Venezuelan black-and-white films